Tylopilus subcellulosus is a bolete fungus in the family Boletaceae found in Tamaulipas, Mexico, where it grows under oak. It was described as new to science in 1991.

See also
List of North American boletes

References

External links

subcellulosus
Fungi described in 1991
Fungi of Mexico
Fungi without expected TNC conservation status